The 1871 Newry by-election was fought on 23 January 1871.  The byelection was fought due to the death of the incumbent Liberal MP William Kirk.  It was won by the unopposed Conservative candidate Viscount Newry and Morne.  The Liberal Party narrowly won the seat at the 1874 general election.

References

1871 elections in the United Kingdom
By-elections to the Parliament of the United Kingdom in County Armagh constituencies
By-elections to the Parliament of the United Kingdom in County Down constituencies
Unopposed by-elections to the Parliament of the United Kingdom (need citation)
19th century in County Armagh
19th century in County Down
1871 elections in Ireland